The 2019–20 season is Lincoln City's 136th season in their history and their first season back in League One after being promoted as champions out of League Two in the 2018/2019 season. Along with League One, the club also participates in the FA Cup, EFL Trophy and the club has been eliminated from EFL Cup

The season covers the period from 1 July 2019 to 30 June 2020.

Pre-season
As of 30 May 2019, Lincoln City have announced six pre-season friendlies against Stoke City, Nottingham Forest, Lincoln United, Gainsborough Trinity, Scunthorpe United and Sheffield Wednesday.

Competitions

League One

League table

Results summary

Results by matchday

Matches
On 20 June 2019 the EFL League One fixtures were revealed.

FA Cup

The first round draw was made on 21 October 2019.

EFL Cup

The first round draw was made on 20 June. The second round draw was made on 13 August 2019 following the conclusion of all but one first round matches.

EFL Trophy

On 9 July 2019, the pre-determined group stage draw was announced with Invited clubs to be drawn on 12 July 2019.

Transfers

Transfers in

Transfers out

Loans in

Loans out

Squad statistics

Appearances 

|-
|colspan="12" style="text-align:center;" |Players no longer at the club

|-
|}

References

Lincoln City F.C. seasons
Lincoln City